A statue of horticulturist John McLaren is installed in San Francisco's Golden Gate Park, in the U.S. state of California.

Background
In 1911 Alma de Bretteville Spreckels and her husband Adolph B. Spreckels, park commissioner and namesake of Spreckels Lake, wanted M. Earl Cummings to capture McLaren's likeness. The San Francisco Examiner reported in 1911 that McLaren had modeled for Cummings, and the statue was to be shown at a Bohemian Club art exhibition (Carvala).  The Examiner also reported In 1921 the Examiner reported, park commissioners wanted the statue erected in Golden Gate Park “soon.” But in 1922 according to The Oakland Tribune, McLaren hid it in a box in the park stables as " McLaren did not want to see it " (Carvala, Peterson). 
 
It was found after McLaren's death and erected in John McLaren Memorial Rhododendron Dell in 1945. It is a bronze 5'7'' likeness (Carvala).  It does not sit on a pedestal and has no identification, as Cummings thought everybody would know who McLaren was. Over time the statue has turned green, so it is unassuming and blends into its surroundings. In one hand he is holding a pinecone. Saw marks are on McLaren's right leg from an attempt to steal the statue on December 17, 1953. Two attempts were made, the first of which the thieves tried to “crowbar the statue off its base. Three days later on what would have been McLaren's birthday a hack saw was used to try to cut the statue down. (San Francisco Chronicle).

References

External links
 

 

 

 

                
                        

 

Golden Gate Park
Monuments and memorials in California
Outdoor sculptures in San Francisco
Sculptures of men in California
Statues in California